Mellitella stokesii is a species of sand dollar within the family Mellitidae. The species is found in the eastern Pacific off the coasts of Mexico, Costa Rica, Panama, and Ecuador at depths up to 49 meters.

References 

Mellitidae
Animals described in 1841
Echinoderms of North America
Echinoderms of South America
Fauna of the Galápagos Islands
Fauna of the Pacific Ocean